Queen is a 2013 Indian comedy-drama film directed by Vikas Bahl and produced by Anurag Kashyap and Vikramaditya Motwane. The film stars Kangana Ranaut in the lead role, and features Rajkummar Rao and Lisa Haydon in supporting roles. The film was edited by Abhijit Kokate and Kashyap, and the cinematography was provided by Bobby Singh. Amit Trivedi composed the musical score for the film. Queen tells the story of Rani, an under-confident woman, who embarks on her honeymoon alone after her fiancé calls off their wedding.

The film garnered awards and nominations in several categories, with particular praise for its direction, performance of Ranaut, cinematography, and editing. As of June 2015, the film has won 32 awards.

At the 62nd National Film Awards, Queen won the awards for Best Feature Film in Hindi and Best Actress (Ranaut). At the 60th Filmfare Awards ceremony, Queen won six awards, more than any other film, including Best Film, Best Director (Bahl), and Best Actress. Haydon and Tridevi also garnered nominations for Best Supporting Actress and Best Music Director, respectively. Queen received the most nominations at the 2015 Screen Awards ceremony, and won the awards for Best Film, Best Director, and Best Cinematography (Singh). Ranaut, Rao and Haydon were nominated for Best Actress, Best Supporting Actor and Best Supporting Actress, respectively. The film also won five awards at the 16th ceremony of the International Indian Film Academy Awards, including Best Movie and Best Actress.

Accolades

See also
 List of Bollywood films of 2014

Footnotes

References

External links
 Accolades for Queen at the Internet Movie Database

Lists of accolades by Indian film